The name Julian has been used for one tropical cyclone in the Atlantic Ocean.
 Tropical Storm Julian (2021) – short-lived tropical storm that formed in the central subtropical Atlantic and stayed at sea.

The name Julian has been used for five tropical cyclones in the Western Pacific. The name was assigned by PAGASA in the Philippines.
 Tropical Storm Kompasu (2004) (T0409, 12W, Julian)
 Tropical Storm Kammuri (2008) (T0809, 10W, Julian) – struck China and Vietnam
 Typhoon Bolaven (2012) (T1215, 16W, Julian)
 Severe Tropical Storm Aere (2016) (T1619, 22W, Julian)
 Typhoon Maysak (2020) (T2009, 10W, Julian)

Atlantic hurricane set index articles
Pacific typhoon set index articles